David William Matula (born 1937) is an American mathematician and computer scientist known for his research on graph theory, graph algorithms, computer arithmetic, and algorithm engineering. He is a professor emeritus at Southern Methodist University, where he formerly held the Cruse C. and Marjorie F. Calahan Centennial Chair in Engineering.

Education and career
Matula was an undergraduate at Washington University in St. Louis, graduating in 1959. He completed his Ph.D. in 1966 at the University of California, Berkeley, with the dissertation Games of Sequence Prediction supervised by David Blackwell.

After completing his Ph.D., he returned to Washington University in St. Louis as a faculty member. He joined the Southern Methodist University faculty in 1974 as chair of the Computer Science and Engineering Department, was named to the Cruse C. and Marjorie F. Calahan Centennial Chair in Engineering in 2016, and retired in 2018.

Book
Matula is the coauthor, with Peter Kornerup, of the book Finite Precision Number Systems and Arithmetic (Encyclopedia of Mathematics and its Applications 133, Cambridge University Press, 2010).

References

External links
Home page

1937 births
Living people
20th-century American mathematicians
21st-century American mathematicians
Graph theorists
American computer scientists
Washington University in St. Louis alumni
University of California, Berkeley alumni
Washington University in St. Louis faculty
Southern Methodist University faculty